PHOIBLE is a linguistic database accessible through its website and compiling phonological inventories from primary documents and tertiary databases into a single, easily searchable sample. The 2019 version 2.0 includes 3,020 inventories containing 3,183 segment types found in 2,186 distinct languages. It is edited by Steven Moran, Assistant Professor from the Institute of Biology at the University of Neuchâtel and Daniel McCloy, Researcher at the Institute for Learning and Brain Sciences at the University of Washington.

Principles of PHOIBLE 
PHOIBLE attempts to be faithful to the description of languages in source documents (often called "doculects") and to encode all character data in a consistent representation in Unicode API.

Its data is published under the Creative Commons Attribution-Share Alike 3.0 licence (CC BY-SA 3.0).

Organisation of the database 

The website is very similar to those of Glottolog, WALS and APiCS.

Since the release of PHOIBLE 2.0 in 2019, the data is taken from the Cross-Linguistic Data Formats (CLDF) dataset of the Cross-Linguistic Linked Data (CLLD) project.

The languages are classified by family, geographical coordinates and world regions (Africa, North and South America, Australia, Eurasia and Papunesia).

The individual language pages include geographical information from Glottolog, with a link to its site with the glottocode of the language, and another with the ISO 639-3 code pointing to that of SIL. They also include links to one or more phoneme inventories, with associated bibliographic records for each source. Multiple entries are based on separate sources that disagree on the number and/or identity of phonemes in the language.

In addition to phoneme inventories, PHOIBLE includes distinctive feature data for each phoneme in each language. This system is loosely based on Hayes' Introductory Phonology with some additions from Moisik and Esling's The 'whole larynx' approach to laryngeal features, but may change as new languages are added.

A subset of 451 languages in PHOIBLE comes from the UCLA Phonological Segment Inventory Database, whose author, Ian Maddieson, is a contributor to the chapter on phonology in WALS.

References

Bibliography

External links 
 

Linguistics websites
Linguistics databases
Cross-Linguistic Linked Data